Muguru  or  Mooguru is a village in the southern state of Karnataka, India. It is located in the Tirumakudal Narsipur taluk of Mysore district in Karnataka.

There is a famous temple here for goddess Tripurasundari, also called as Thibbadevi.

Also, the epic says, there resides the deity's better half, Lord Shiva and her sister too.
So, two temples, one each for Lord Shiva, and another for Thibbadevi's sister also exists in this village.

There will be a famous fair that happens here during the month of January or February, mostly during the festival of Sankranthi. This fair is locally known as "Chiguru odoya jaatre". Many visitors from Mysore, Bangalore, Chamrajanagara and elsewhere visit for the fair.

During this festival, goddesses from neighboring villages, who according to the priest and villagers, are supposed to be sisters of goddess Thibbadevi are bought in procession to Muguru. Traditionally the sisters of goddess come to visit sri Thibbadevi and then, the procession is taken all around the village before bringing the curtains down for the three-day Shri Thibbadevi jaatre.

Jain Temples
There are two Digambar Jain temples dedicated to Tirthankar Adinath and Parshwanath at Muguru. Their history dates back to 11th-12th century A.D.

Demographics
As of 2001 India census, Muguru had a population of 7727 with 3949 males and 3778 females.

People
The residents of Muguru are Kannadigas. Many experts believe that one of the Smartha Brahmin community in Karnataka called Muguru Karnataka Brahmins derives its name from this village.

Gallery

See also
 Mysore
 Districts of Karnataka

References

External links

Villages in Mysore district